The following radio stations broadcast on FM frequency 94.2 MHz:

Indonesia
 Gema Surya FM in Ponorogo Regency

Malaysia
 Mix in Seremban and Negeri Sembilan
 Perak FM in Lenggong

Nepal
 Radio Karnali Aawaj in Simikot

New Zealand
 The Edge in Auckland

Singapore
 Warna 94.2FM

References

Lists of radio stations by frequency